The 2017 Uzbekistan Cup is the 25th season of the annual Uzbek football Cup competition. 

The competition started on 19 March 2017, and ended in November 2017.

The cup winner is guaranteed a place in the 2018 AFC Champions League.

Matches

First round

Second round

Third round

Quarter-finals

Semi-finals

1st Legs

2nd Legs

Bunyodkor won 2–0 on aggregate

Lokomotiv won 3–2 on aggregate

Final

See also
2017 Uzbek League

External links

Uzbek Cup News, (Russian)
Uzbek Cup Results, (Russian)

References

Cup
Uzbekistan Cup
Uzbekistan Cup